Kharbatha Bani Harith is a Palestinian town in the central West Bank, located 15 kilometers west of Ramallah in the Ramallah and al-Bireh Governorate. The name of the town is probably a corruption of Khirbat Bani Harith ("the ruins of the sons of Harith"). According to the Palestinian Central Bureau of Statistics, the town had a population of 2,846.  It has a total land area of 7,120 dunams.

Location

History
Pottery sherds from  Iron Age II,  Persian, Byzantine, Byzantine/Umayyad and Mamluk era have been found here.

Ottoman era
Kharbatha Bani Harith was incorporated into the Ottoman Empire in 1517 with all of Palestine, and in 1596 it appeared under the name of Harabta in the  tax registers, being in the nahiya ("subdistrict") of Ramla, which was under the administration of the liwa ("district") of Gaza. It had a population of 29 Muslims and 4 Christian households. They paid a fixed tax-rate of 25% on agricultural products, including wheat, barley, summer crops, vineyards, fruit trees, goats and beehives, in addition to occasional revenues; a total of 2,200 Akçe. All of the revenues went to a Waqf.

In 1870, Victor Guérin found the village to have about 200 inhabitants. He also noted the remains of a church,  which has been dated to the Byzantine era.

In 1882, the PEF's Survey of Western Palestine described the village, called Khurbetha Ibn Harith, as being of medium size, with a well on the west, "standing on high ground among the olive trees."

British Mandate era
In the 1922 census of Palestine, conducted by the British Mandate authorities, Kharbata had a population of 338 inhabitants, all Muslim. In the 1931 census it had increased to a  population of 469, still all Muslim, in 102 inhabited houses.

In the 1945 statistics the population of Kharbata was 650, all Muslims, who owned 7,120 dunams of land according to an official land and population survey. 2,788 dunams were plantations and irrigable land, 591 used for cereals, while 9 dunams were built-up (urban) land.

Jordanian era
In the wake of the 1948 Arab–Israeli War, and after the 1949 Armistice Agreements, Kharbatha Bani Harith came under Jordanian rule.

The Jordanian census of 1961 found 835 inhabitants in Kh. Harithiya.

1967-present
After the Six-Day War in 1967,  Kharbatha Bani Harith came under Israeli occupation.

After the 1995 accords, 942 dunums of village land were classified Area B, the remaining 6,200 dunums as Area C.

According to ARIJ, 833 dunams of village land has been confiscated by Israel for the Israeli settlement of Modi'in Illit.

See also 
Kharbatha al-Misbah

References

Bibliography

External links
Welcome To Kharbata
Survey of Western Palestine, Map 14:  IAA, Wikimedia commons 
 Kharbatha Bani Harith Village (Fact Sheet),  Applied Research Institute–Jerusalem (ARIJ)
Kharbatha Bani Harith Village Profile, ARIJ
Kharbatha Bani Harith aerial photo, ARIJ

Towns in the West Bank
Municipalities of the State of Palestine